Hizaki (stylized as HIZAKI, born February 17, 1979) is a Japanese visual kei metal musician, songwriter and record producer. He is best known as guitarist of the symphonic power metal band Versailles. He is also a member of Jupiter and has a solo career. Before forming Versailles he was in several independent bands.

Early life
Hizaki grew up in the countryside of Shiga Prefecture. He liked classical music in kindergarten, especially the violin, but his parents refused to let him learn the violin or piano. When he was in sixth grade his older brother started to learn guitar, and after Hizaki's first time playing with it, he "dove into music." Even at that young age he hated playing other people's songs, and wanted to create his own. Already a fan of Loudness and X Japan, Hizaki wanted to play lead guitar, but was not skilled enough for their songs at the time and so created his own guitar exercises. After studying diligently, Hizaki was quite skilled by middle school, but had no one around him at his level. He entered high school during Japan's band boom and so finally had others to play with in a band, but had to lower his skill level in order to fit in. While unwavered in his love of metal and visual kei, his friends preferred punk or grunge. As such, Hizaki said he had no fun in the band and that his high school days were "quite gloomy."

After graduating, Hizaki moved to Kyoto and finally found the music scene he always longed for. Already comfortable wearing makeup from shows in high school, he formed a visual kei band with a former upperclassman of his and the upperclassman's friends. He explained that ever since he started guitar, he felt that being able to play was not enough, one must be good-looking or put on a great performance; "I always thought about how I could stand out on stage, and eventually, my conclusion was to look like a girl." In 2020, Hizaki remarked that his visual kei style of makeup and skirts has been the same since high school. He also noted that he has a lot of childhood photographs where he is wearing red clothes, possibly being the reason a lot of his stage costumes are red.

Career
Hizaki debuted as guitarist for the Kyoto-based visual kei band Garnet Grave in 1997. After two years, Hizaki and bassist Hizumi departed from Garnet Grave to form Crack Brain with guitarist Airi (Madeth Gray'll).

In 2002, Crack Brain disbanded and Hizaki and Airi formed the band , who in May 2003 changed their name to Schwardix Marvally. They released two EPs, one composed of cover songs from various bands. Soon after releasing the two EPs, Schwardix Marvally disbanded in 2004.
 
Hizaki then proceeded to start a solo career that same year and released Maiden Ritual. He published two more EPs: Dance with Grace and Maiden Ritual -Experiment Edition- with a variety of musicians in the visual kei scene. In 2005 he put his solo work on hold and joined Sulfuric Acid, staying until they disbanded in October 2006. On 31 October, Hizaki supported Lareine at their last concert.

He then restarted solo activities and formed his solo group, Hizaki Grace Project, with Hikaru (Izabel Varosa) on vocals, Yuu (Jakura) on bass and support drummer Seiji (Sulfuric Acid). After recruiting Mikage (Babylon) on drums, Teru (Aikaryu) on guitar and Juka (Moi dix Mois) on vocals, they released the album Dignity of Crest. Hizaki Grace Project's album, Curse of Virgo, was released on 26 December 2007.

In early 2007, he became support for Node of Scherzo, a project fronted by Kamijo (Lareine), Juka and Kaya (Schwarz Stein), and also supported by Jasmine You and Asagi (D). At Node of Scherzo's first live performance on 14 March, Kamijo and Hizaki announced they were forming a band together. On 30 March, the details of the band were announced, it would be named Versailles and also included drummer Yuki (Sugar Trip) and Hizaki Grace Project's Jasmine You and Teru. Hizaki's solo work was put on hold while he focused on Versailles.

On September 23, 2008, Hizaki modeled clothing for Baby, The Stars Shine Bright on the runway at Individual Fashion Expo IV. On 15 July 2010, he partook in the one-night only revival of Crack Brain, at a concert for their old record label, Crow Music.

In January 2011, he and the rest of Versailles started starring in their own TV mini drama called . The show also starred Rina Koike and aired on Mainichi Broadcasting System and TV Kanagawa until March.

In response to the 2011 Tōhoku earthquake and tsunami on 11 March, Hizaki composed and dedicated the song "Prayer" to its victims. Both Hizaki and Teru participated in the Blue Planet Japan project, which was created in response to the Tōhoku earthquake and tsunami. The project is composed of many visual kei artists, including members of DaizyStripper, heidi., Matenrou Opera and Dolly. They performed live at Shibuya O-West on 25 June and released the single "Hitotsu Dake ~We are the One~" on 14 September, with the proceeds from the single donated to the victims.

Hizaki composed the music for the title track of Kaya's January 2012 single "Vampire Requiem". On 20 July, Versailles announced they were stopping all activities by the end of the year. Hizaki, Kaya, Versailles bassist Masashi, Ken Morioka (Soft Ballet), Kenta Harada and Chargeeeeee (Omega Dripp, ZIZ) performed in a special session band on 7 October at Shinjuku Loft.

On 1 April 2013, every member of Versailles minus singer Kamijo announced they had formed a new band named Jupiter. They recruited Zin as vocalist and released their debut single, "Blessing of the Future", in the summer. That same year Hizaki participated in the Dead End Tribute - Song of Lunatics - album, paying tribute to the band Dead End by performing on the cover of their song "Dress Burning".

Hizaki returned to solo activities in 2015 with short European and South American tours. He released his first solo album in 11 years, Rosario, on 3 August 2016, via major record label Warner Music Japan. A mini album, Back to Nature, was released by Zeno Records on 27 November 2019. The single "Pavane" was released on 15 July 2020, and credited to Hizaki grace project. The solo mini album Rusalka was released on 17 February 2021. As Hizaki's first international solo release, Setsuzoku Records combined his past two mini albums into Rusalka + Back to Nature, which was released on 17 September 2021.

Music
The focus of Hizaki's solo work is guitar instrumentals, creating the main melody with the guitar. He said the idea is to replace the vocalist with a guitar. Rather than technical skill, he thinks his ability to create melodies is where he excels. Hizaki said his approach to guitar solos in a band is different than other guitarists; instead of trying to match the flow of the song and insert a solo, he tries to "bring the song into another dimension." Instead of playing "on top of the hook," Hizaki creates a song within a song. He suggested this was influenced by She-Ja (Gargoyle, Animetal, Volcano), who he said used to play solos "completely irrelevant" to the song.

Hizaki revealed that he hates practicing guitar: "I'm the kind of person who wants to create music whenever I have a guitar in my hands. Practicing studiously is something I really hate, so I almost never do it." He admitted that he regresses and loses his touch, frequently not playing for two days in a row. He said he is unsure of how precise his picking is, but is sure that he has a "heavy" way of picking.

Hizaki admitted that at the beginning of Jupiter it was pretty similar to Versailles, as it had four of the same five members. But when Versailles reunited, they chose distinct directions for each, and in 2020, said the main difference was the vocalist's key. He described Kuze as having a "powerful, masculine voice with transcendent high tones while Versailles' vocalist has a mid-range voice with a great aesthetic appeal." Since the key is different, Hizaki's approach to composing music for each is different as well, and he views the two bands as completely different.

Hizaki Grace Project members
Last line-up
 Hizaki – guitar
 Yuu/Jasmine You – bass
 Teru – guitar
 Mikage – drums
 Juka – vocals

Former members
 Hikaru – vocals
 Seiji – drums (support member)

Equipment
Current
- ESP Maiden Hizaki Custom Rose

Other
- ESP Horizon-III Hizaki Custom Pearl White Gold w/flake 
- ESP Horizon-III Hizaki Custom Illusion
- ESP Bottom Line GT 
- Boss GT-10 Guitar Effects Processor
- Boss SD-1 Super Overdrive 
- Ibanez Jemini Distortion Pedal 
- Ibanez TS-9 Tube Screamer 
- Marshall Guvnor 
- Morley Wah Pedal 
- Custom Audio Electronics Cables 
- TC Electronic G Major 
- Korg DTR-1 Rack Tuner 
- EX-PRO Wireless System 
- Furman Power Conditioner 
- Roland FC-200 Midi Foot Controller 
- Marshall JVM410H 
- Hughes & Kettner, Bogner, Brunetti, Mesa Boogie and Laney Amps 
- Keeley Katana Boost Pedal 
- Boorocks MD-1 LEON Multi-Driver

Discography
Albums and EPs
 Maiden Ritual (29 September 2004)
 Dance with grace (27 April 2005; two editions: regular was instrumental)
 Maiden Ritual -Experiment Edition- (11 May 2005)
The song "Tragic Serenade" was replaced by the instrumental "Scarlet", while "Ritual" has been replaced by its instrumental version.
 Grace Special Package I (2005)
Three disc box set: includes Dance with grace, Maiden Ritual -Experiment Edition- and bonus CD-R with "Members Comment" and instrumental version of "Tragic Serenade".
 Rosario (2016), Oricon Albums Chart Peak Position: No. 60
 Back to Nature (2019) No. 231
 Rusalka (2021) No. 132
 Rusalka + Back to Nature (2021, international only)

With Hizaki Grace Project
Albums
 Dignity of Crest (1 January 2007)
 Ruined Kingdom (19 September 2007)	
 Curse of Virgo (26 December 2007)

Singles
 "Pavane" (15 July 2020)

DVD
 
 , Oricon DVDs Chart Peak Position: No. 264

Omnibuses
 Graceful Playboys (5 August 2006; with "Race Wish")
 -Unique- (9 August 2006; split EP with +Isolation, with "Solitude" and "Cradle")
 Summit 03 (29 November 2009; with "Cradle")
 Final Summit 2000~2010: Sequence Records (16 February 2011; with "Philosopher")

With Garnet Grave

With Crack Brain
 "Crack Diary" (24 July 1999; demo tape)
 
 
 
 -Reset- (23 March 2002)
 "-Speed･R-" (11 May 2002; freely distributed at concert at Meguro Rock-May-Kan)

With Schwardix Marvally
 
 Heaven's Romance (28 January 2004)**Released in two versions, each with a different bonus disc.

With Sulfuric Acid
 "Vanilla Sky" (19 September 2005; freely distributed at concert at Meguro Rock-May-Kan)
 
 
 【s∧lfj'urik 'aesid】 (April 27, 2006)
 
 Final Summit 2000~2010: Sequence Records (16 February 2011; omnibus with "Acid Trip")

With Versailles

With Jupiter

References

External links
 Official website
 Old official website
 Official Twitter
 Hizaki at Kappa Records

1979 births
Living people
Versailles (band) members
Visual kei musicians
Japanese heavy metal guitarists
Japanese songwriters
Japanese male models
Japanese male actors
People from Shiga Prefecture
Unidentified musicians
20th-century Japanese guitarists
21st-century Japanese guitarists
Male-to-female cross-dressers